Sloka Gora is a small settlement north of Turjak in the Municipality of Velike Lašče in central Slovenia. The entire municipality is part of the traditional region of Lower Carniola and is now included in the Central Slovenia Statistical Region.

A small, relatively well preserved Early Iron Age hill fort with visible earthworks and settlement terraces can be seen near the settlement.

References

External links
Sloka Gora on Geopedia

Populated places in the Municipality of Velike Lašče